Daegu Gyeongbuk Institute of Science and Technology (DGIST) (Korean: 대구경북과학기술원) is a public science and engineering university located in Daegu Technopolis, Daegu, South Korea. DGIST is one of the four public universities in South Korea dedicated to research in science and technology, along with KAIST, GIST, and UNIST. Under a Special Act on Support of Scientists and Engineers for Strengthening National Science and Technology Competitiveness, the Korean government enacted Daegu Gyeongbuk Institute of Science and Technology Act (Act No. 6996) and founded DGIST in 2004 as a research institute. In 2008, the act was amended to extend the role of the institute to both research and education, which eventually enabled a transition from a research institute to a university.

History 
In 2004, the Korean Government established DGIST as a research institute to promote national science and technology, and located the institute in Daegu to invigorate the local economy. The government amended DGIST Act in 2008, enabling the institute to offer its educational (degree) programs.

The first president of the institute, when it had a form as a research institute, was Kyu-Suk Chung, appointed in 2004; the second was In Seon Lee, appointed in 2007. The current president (as of April 2019), Dr. Young Kuk, took office as the fourth president of DGIST after Dr. Sang Hyuk Son.

Dec 11, 2003 || Enacted DGIST Act (Act No. 6996,) which implies its legal basis for the establishment of DGIST

Sep 03, 2004 || First President Kyu-Suk Chung was Inaugurated (research institute)

Sep 07, 2004 || Registered the Establishment of DGIST as a research institute

Sep 03, 2007 || Second President In-Seon Lee was Inaugurated (research institute)

Jun 13, 2008 || Amended the DGIST Act (Act No. 9108) to allow DGIST to offer its educational (degree) programs

May 8, 2009 || DGIST Vision & University Identity Proclamation Ceremony

Nov 22, 2010 || Moved Campus to Current Site, Hyeonpung

Feb 25, 2011 || Dr. Sung-Chul Shin was inaugurated as founding president of university

Dec 14, 2011 || Established the Korea Brain Research Institute (KBRI), affiliated institute of DGIST

Jul 16, 2012 || Established the DGIST-LBNL Joint Research Center

Oct 08, 2012 || Established the Center for Plant Aging-Research, Institute for Basic Science (IBS)

Oct 30, 2012 || Established the CPS Global Center

Feb 26, 2015 || Dr. Sung-Chul Shin was inaugurated as the Second President of university

Apr 01, 2015 || Established DGIST Convergence Research Institute

Apr 19, 2016 || Established Core Protein Resources Center

Oct 19, 2016 || Established Well Aging Research Center

Mar 22, 2017 || Dr. Sang Hyuk Son was inaugurated as the third president of university

Apr 01, 2019 || Dr. Young Kuk was inaugurated as the fourth president of university

Academics

Undergraduate Program 
School of Undergraduate Studies was opened in 2014 under the College of Transdisciplinary Studies.

Graduate Program 

The Graduate School has been offering Master's and Doctoral Degree Programs, including integrated MS-PhD programs.

 Department of Emerging Materials Science
Quantum materials, nano/bio materials, computational materials
 Department of Interdisciplinary Studies
Cyber Physical Systems (CPS), bio-medical systems, smart connected systems
 Department of Robotics Engineering
Surgical robot, rehabilitation and life support robots, bio micro-nano robot, BRI, robot design, service robots
 Department of Energy Science & Engineering
Renewable energy, energy conversion and storage, materials design
 Department of Brain & Cognitive Sciences
Neuro-metabolism, sensory system, neuro-degeneration, theoretical biophysics
 Department of New Biology
Aging biology, nano-bio imaging, systems and complex biology, bio-sustainability, biochemistry and biophysics

Research

DGIST Convergence Research Institute 

DGIST-LBNL Research Center for Emerging Materials
Research Center for Resilient Cyber Physical Systems
Convergence Research Center for Microlaser Technology
DGIST-ETH Microrobot Research Center
Core Protein Resources Center
Well Aging Research Center
Global Center for Bio-Convergence Spin System
Brain Engineering Convergence Research Center
Magnetics Initiative Life Care Research Center
Research Center for Extreme Exploitation of Dark Data
Center for Proteome Biophysics
Research Center for Thin Film Solar Cells
 ICT Research Institute
Division of Electronics & Information System
Division of Automative Technology
Division of Intelligent Robot
 Materials Research Institute
Division of Energy Technology
Division of Nanotechnology
Division of Biotechnology

Research Infra 
In addition to the DGIST Convergence Research Institute, DGIST has state-of-the-art infrastructure to support and facilitate efficient research.
Center for Technology Commercialization
Tech Startup Promotion Team
Technology Commercialization Team

Center for Technology Startup Education
Technology Startup Education Team

People 
The total number of members in DGIST was counted as 2,119 (as of April 2019). The number includes 1,486 of students enrolled for the 2019 school year (807 Undergraduates, 375 Master's program students, 177 Ph.D. program students, 75 Integrated MS-PhD Program students and 52 Combined Undergraduate-Graduate Program). Currently, 207 of faculty, 205 researchers, and 221 of administrative staffs are working at DGIST.

Presidents 
 Chung Kyu-Suk (2004–2007) 1st president of DGIST research institute
 Lee In-Seon (2007–2011) 2nd president of DGIST research institute
 Shin Sung-chul (2011–2017) 1st and 2nd president of DGIST University
 Son Sang Hyuk (2017–2018) 3rd president of DGIST University
 Kuk Young (2019–current) 4th president of DGIST University

See also 
List of national universities in South Korea
List of universities and colleges in South Korea
Education in Korea

References 

1. Official website of the university: DGIST
2. Article 'DGIST aims for spot among world-leading science universities': DGIST aims for spot among world-leading science universities

Universities and colleges in Daegu
Institute for Basic Science